James Alexander Stevenson (24 June 1915 — 5 September 1993) was a Scottish first-class cricketer.

Stevenson was born in June 1915 at Edinburgh, where he was educated at the Edinburgh Academy. A club cricketer for Edinburgh Academical Cricket Club, he made his debut for Scotland against Ireland at Belfast in 1937. Prior to the Second World War, he made two further first-class appearances, against Yorkshire at Harrogate on Scotland's 1937 tour of England, and against Ireland at Glasgow in 1938. He served in the British Army during the war, playing in a minor match for the British Army cricket team against a combined Royal Air Force and Royal Navy side in 1941. Following the war, he made a fourth and final first-class appearance for Scotland against Yorkshire at Scarborough in 1951. Playing as a batsman in the Scottish side, Stevenson scored 127 runs at an average of 21.16, with a highest score of 45 not out. Outside of cricket, he was a stockbroker by profession. Stevenson died in September 1993 at Gullane, East Lothian.

References

External links
 

1915 births
1993 deaths
Cricketers from Edinburgh
People educated at Edinburgh Academy
Scottish stockbrokers
Scottish cricketers
British Army personnel of World War II